The Batasang Pambansa, often referred to simply as the Batasan, was the legislature of the Philippines, established as an interim assembly in 1978 and later as an official body in 1984. It was the fourth unicameral legislature in Philippine history.  Members of the Batasang Pambansa were referred to as "Mambabatas Pambansa" (English: Member of Parliament, literally "National Lawmaker"), shortened to "MP".

The Batasan was instituted under the 1973 Constitution promulgated by then-President Ferdinand Marcos, replacing the earlier Congress of the Philippines established by the 1935 Commonwealth Constitution. It was abolished immediately after the People Power Revolution in 1986, and Congress was restored with the passage of the 1987 Constitution.

History 
The original provisions of the 1973 Constitution, which was ratified on January 17, 1973, provided for the establishment of a unicameral National Assembly. Upon its ratification, an interim National Assembly composed of the president and the vice president, those who served as president of the 1971 Constitutional Convention, members of the Senate and the House of Representatives, and the delegates to the 1971 Constitutional Convention, was established and functioned as the legislature. Before the Regular Batasang Pambansa convened, a 120-member interim body served as the national legislature. The body was composed of the incumbent president, representatives elected from different regions and from different sectors, and select Cabinet officials appointed by the president. In 1981, the semi-parliamentary legislature was formally convened as the Batasang Pambansa, and in 1985, some dissident members unsuccessfully tried to impeach President Marcos.
	 
On March 25, 1986, Proclamation No. 3, commonly known as the 1986 Freedom Constitution, was promulgated, effectively abolishing the Batasang Pambansa.

References

External links
 Website of the Philippine House of Representatives: Brief History of the Philippine Congress

 
Philippines
Fourth Philippine Republic
Tagalog words and phrases